Upware North Pit is a  biological Site of Special Scientific Interest north-west of Wicken in Cambridgeshire.

This site has several flooded pits with areas of willow and hawthorn. It is one of only two British sites which has water germander, a plant listed in the British Red Data Books of threatened species. Other unusual aquatic plants are great water dock and greater pond sedge.

There is access to the site from the Fen Rivers Way north of Upware.

References

Sites of Special Scientific Interest in Cambridgeshire
Wicken, Cambridgeshire